Australian rules football in South Australia has long been the most popular sport in the state.

Forms of football were played very early in the history of the Colony of South Australia pre-dating the organisation of Australian rules football in Victoria and rivalled football's popularity there.

In 1877, the colony officially adopted the code in order to compete in the very first intercolonial representative football match in Australia against Victoria. The first governing body, the South Australian Football Association formed on 13 April 1877, remains the oldest competition in Australia.

Since the Federation of Australia, South Australia has been the second strongest of all the states in the sport. From 1976 to 2003 South Australia held the record for the largest attendance in the sport outside of Victoria. South Australia holds the world record for a non-VFL/AFL attendance with the 1976 SANFL Grand Final drawing an estimated 80,000 spectators which remains the record crowd for any code of football in the state and the third highest official attendance outside of Victoria. The SANFL remains the second most attended league worldwide in the sport. Several South Australian clubs have been crowned Champions of Australia, with Port Adelaide having held the title the most times most overall (4). The South Australian state football team (the "Croweaters") have defeated every state in Interstate matches in Australian rules football including Victoria with the intense rivalry inspiring the popular catchcry "Kick a Vic".

South Australia in 2019 had the highest participation rate (4.8%) of any state in Australia (and second only to the Northern Territory) and is the only state or territory in Australia where Australian rules football participation is higher than soccer.

There are two professional Australian Football League clubs based in the state: the Adelaide Football Club (1990) and Port Adelaide Football Club (1870), the latter having the distinction of being the only pre-existing club to have entered the AFL from another league, as a  founding member of the SAFA (SANFL). These two clubs compete against each other in the "Showdown".

The state has produced some of the greatest Australian Footballers of all time, including the Australian Football Hall of Fame legends: Barrie Robran, Malcolm Blight, Jack Oatey and Russell Ebert. Craig Bradley holds the record for the most AFL games for a born and raised South Australian with 375, while Stephen Kernahan has kicked the most AFL goals with 738. In women's Australian rules, Erin Phillips is arguably the greatest with 2 AFLW best and fairests and also has kicked the most goals, while Ebony Marinoff has played the most AFLW games.

History

Early examples of football (1843–1853) 

The first recorded game of any "football" in South Australia was that of 'Caid' played in Thebarton by people of the local Irish community in 1843 to celebrate St Patrick's Day.

In 1844 there was debate amongst the South Australian Legislative Council whether it be allowed that "foot-ball"  be played on Sundays, with arguments against preferring the quiet worship of God.

In 1853 a group of Irishmen from Westmeath, Ireland placed an advertisement in the South Australian Register calling for Irishmen from another county of Ireland to join them in Thebarton to play a game of football.

In 1854 at the opening of a new school in Morphett Vale, at the end of the first day the students played a game of football amongst other activities.

In 1855 William Anderson Cawthorne illustrated a series of images documenting South Australia's indigenous people including a pair of playthings, one being a sling and the other being a ball, referred to in Kaurna language as Pando.

John Acraman and St Peters College (1854) 

In 1854 Adelaide businessman John Acraman imported five round footballs from England and paid for the construction of goal posts at St Peter's College in Adelaide's eastern suburbs. St Peter's football matches were played between Frome Road and Adelaide Bridge, on a similar site to the current University Oval. "Harrow rules" involving kicking the ball but not running with it.

Growing popularity (1855–1859) 
In June 1855 the Sunday School associated with St Jude's Church in Brighton included football for its children's activities.

On 4 November 1856 a Temperance Festival with 400 participants included games of football.

In 1857 a football match was held in Glenelg as part of the annual Commemoration Festival to celebrate the 21st anniversary of the proclamation of the colony of South Australia.

In 1859 the Gawler Institute ran a rural fete which included a game of football being staged. The start of this match featured "a long first run to the ball". On 12 March 1859 the town of Angaston held a farewell party for Charles Fuller which included football. For the Prince of Wales Birthday the Drapers Assistants Association included a football game in their festivities at Waterfall Gully. During a Christmas picnic in 1859 football was played by the employees of 'English & Brown' at Fourth Creek (River Torrens).

Formation of designated clubs (1860–1875) 

The earliest recorded football club in South Australia was the original Adelaide Football Club, formed on 26 April 1860. The Adelaide club hosted intra-club matches to provide a platform for football games to be played. Later in 1860 two new teams were formed bearing the names North Adelaide Football Club and South Adelaide Football Club, unrelated to the modern namesakes.

On 20 May 1861 the Adelaide Council were presented with a request by a party representing an "East Adelaide Football Club" (John Clark) to erect football goals in the East Park Lands but were refused.

In 1862 the newly formed Modbury and Tea Tree Gully Football Club was invited to play a match against the Adelaide team. A return match was held later in the year. The early years of football were poorly organised and dogged by argument over which set of rules to adopt. In fact, after a match between Port Adelaide and Kensington in 1873, it was remarked that neither side understood the rules clearly, and there was uncertainty over which team had won.  However, as the years progressed, there became a growing push for uniformity and structure in South Australian football.

20 July Meeting (1876) 

After a period of years with clubs fighting over technicalities of rules a meeting was held between representatives of the Adelaide, South Adelaide, Victorian and Woodville clubs. At the meeting Charles Kingston argued that "it was possible that someday an inter-colonial football match might be played, and it was desirable in that case that South Australian players should play the game as it was played in other colonies". During his plea to the other clubs at the meeting he compared the 'Old Adelaide rules' to those used in Victoria saying 'practically there was but little difference between them'.

Establishment of SAFA (1877) 
Following an initial meeting on Thursday 19 April 1877 at Prince Alfred Hotel  called by Richard Twopeny the Captain of the Adelaide Football Club two delegates each from the following Football Clubs - Kensington, South Park, Willunga, Port Adelaide, Adelaide, North Adelaide, Prince Alfred College, Gawler, Kapunda, Bankers, Woodville, South Adelaide and Victorian attended a meeting held at the Prince Alfred Hotel in King William Street, Adelaide held on 30 April 1877 to develop a uniform set of rules and establish a governing body.

They formed the South Australian Football Association, the first governing body of its type for football in Australia, and adopted rules similar to those used in Victoria. The use of an oval ball, bouncing the ball and pushing from behind forbidden amongst the rules agreed. The inaugural 1877 SAFA season was contested by 8 clubs.

Early years of organised competition (1877–1886) 
A newly formed club Norwood joined the South Australian Football Association in 1878, but Bankers (1877), Woodville (1877), Kensington (1877-1881), South Park (1877-1884), Victorian (1877-1884), Willunga, North Adelaide, Prince Alfred College and Kapunda had all left within the first 10 years. In 1879-1880 there was a growing call to create a junior competition for the growing number of other clubs which included amongst others - North Parks, St.Peter's College, Prince Alfred College, Royal Parks, West Torrens, Woodville, South Suburban, Hotham, and Middlesex.

The first Annual General Meeting of the Adelaide and Suburban Association was held at Prince Alfred Hotel on 27 March 1882. The following clubs - North Parks, N.A Juniors, Kensington, Kent Town, Albion, Triton, and West Torrens were represented.

The South Australian Junior Football Association was officially formed following meetings held at the Hamburg Hotel on 17 and 24 March 1885. It was decided to limit the Association to 10 clubs - Coromandel Valley, Prospect, Creswick, Medindie, Hindmarsh, Kingston, Lefevre's Peninsula, Semaphore, Albert Park, and Fitzroy.

Growth as major pastime (1887–1915)  
1887 saw existing clubs Gawler, Hotham and West Adelaide join the SAFA competition with the last of those bearing no relation to the modern day West Adelaide Bloods. The Association experienced a resurgence in the late 1880s. From the 1886 season to the 1887 attendances almost doubled.

1888 saw Medindie (which renamed to North Adelaide in 1893) joining the Association, but West Adelaide folded after just one season and Hotham (which had renamed North Adelaide for 1888) merged with Adelaide for 1889. For 1891 Season Gawler withdrew from competition games (having complained about the 1890 program when only given 5 home and 10 away games) but remained a member of the SAFA.

By the 1894 Season, the Association had been reduced to just four clubs (Port Adelaide, South Adelaide, Norwood, North Adelaide originally called Medindie until 1892) with the demise of the Old Adelaide Football Club (which was founded in 1860) at the end of the 1893 Season.

West Torrens (which joined as Port Natives in 1895 and renamed in 1897) and West Adelaide (1897) meant the Association had expanded to six clubs until the turn of the century.

In 1898, the Magarey Medal was awarded to the fairest and most brilliant player for the first time.

Sturt joined the Association in 1901 and in 1907, the Association was renamed the South Australian Football League.

War years (1916–1944) 

The SAFL was suspended from 1916–18 due to World War I.  Glenelg joined the league in 1921.  In 1927, the South Australian Football League was renamed the South Australian National Football League.  During World War II, the eight clubs merged to form four composite clubs over the period 1942–44.

Golden era (1945–1981) 
The post war years saw the code become a part of everyday life with mass media providing greater coverage than ever before. After Port Adelaide had won its 8th premiership in the last 10 seasons the SANFL admitted two new clubs for the 1964 season, Central District and Woodville. The latter club Woodville being located less than 3 km away from Port Adelaide.

Move towards national club competition (1982–1989) 

In 1982 the SANFL approached the VFL in regards to entering two sides, Port Adelaide and longtime major rival , in the Victorian league. This action was also taken by WAFL club East Perth in 1980. All approaches were ignored by the VFL at the time with the reason given by Jack Hamilton being that the VFL clubs thought that one or two SANFL teams would end up being too strong later admitting that they also wanted to continue to poach the states best players, which would soon include Craig Bradley and Stephen Kernahan in 1986. 1982 also saw the first instance of the VFL expanding beyond Melbourne and Geelong with the South Melbourne Football Club being relocated to Sydney. The Port Adelaide Football Club's annual report from late 1982 showed that the failure of the attempts made by South Australian and West Australian clubs to enter the VFL significantly impacted the club's understanding of its future. From this point Port Adelaide restructured the club in regards to economics, public relations and on-field performance for an attempt to enter the league in 1990. There was genuine feeling that failure to do this would result in the club ceasing to exist in the future. In 1985 Port Adelaide registered itself as a national football club. Sentiment at this time amongst the direction of Australian rules football in South Australia was succinctly encapsulated by a Michael Robinson article in the 1985 Football Times Yearbook that previewed the SANFL's upcoming season. In that article Robinson wrote about the disappointment of the equal gate sharing of match takings enforced by the SANFL for the upcoming season with the stronger South Australian clubs propping up ailing clubs such as Woodville.

The following year the SANFL registered the name "Adelaide Football Club" in 1986 but ended up deciding against entering a team into the VFL. In 1986 Norwood Football Club made an independent approach to the VFL with entry into the league discussed in great detail but these discussions ultimately failed to materialise. In 1987 the West Coast Eagles and Brisbane Bears were admitted to the Victorian Football League leaving South Australia as the only mainland state without representation in the VFL.

By 1989 seven out of ten SANFL clubs were recording losses and the combined income of the SANFL and WAFL had dropped to 40% of that of the VFL. The 1989 Port Adelaide annual report and November newsletter contrasted with the outlook of other SANFL and WAFL clubs.

First South Australian AFL club (1990) 
During early 1990 the SANFL had decided to wait three years before making any further decision. Frustrated with lack of progress, Port Adelaide were having secret negotiations in the town of Quorn for entry in 1991. Around the same time AFL was also seeking Norwood to join the national competition in 1990. However Norwood would eventually side with the SANFL after seeing the media reaction to Port Adelaide's attempts.

When the knowledge of Port Adelaide Football Club's negotiations to gain an AFL licence were made public, the other SANFL clubs saw it as an act of treachery. Subsequently, the SANFL clubs, led by Glenelg and Norwood, urged Justice Olssen to make an injunction against the bid, which he agreed to. In total the SANFL spent $500,000 in legal fees to stop Port Adelaide's entry into the AFL, with the latter simply unable to compete in the court room. The SANFL promptly created a composite team to beat Port Adelaide's bid. The Adelaide Football Club gained what was very close to being Port Adelaide's licence to the AFL and began playing in 1991. The new Adelaide club would adopt the moniker of "Crows" after the states inhabitants often used the nickname "Crow-eaters". During this time the SANFL began suing people involved with Port Adelaide, including people volunteering in unpaid positions, with the AFL quickly stepping in to guarantee the protection of the club and associated people. In 2014 during an interview with the Adelaide Advertiser, Ross Oakley revealed that "In desperation to force (the SANFL’s) hand...we began dealing directly with two powerhouse clubs of the SANFL, Norwood and Port Adelaide...we were changing the league’s name to AFL – and we could not go without a team from Adelaide". 

The front runners for the coaching job at the newly created club were both involved in the last SANFL game played in South Australia before the advent of a local AFL team, the 1990 SANFL Grand Final. In that game Port Adelaide, coached by John Cahill defeated Glenelg, coached by Graham Cornes, by 15 points. Graham Cornes ended up being selected to coach Adelaide for the 1991 AFL season. Cornes compiled a club list of the best players from South Australia, with few originating from other states, in what was almost a state side in the first year. Chris McDermott, captain of Glenelg in the 1990 SANFL Grand Final, was designated as the Crows inaugural captain. Despite Port Adelaide being SANFL premiers in 1990, only 5 players from the team became part of the Adelaide squad of 52. Those players being Bruce Abernethy, Simon Tregenza, David Brown, Darren Smith and Scott Hodges, with the last three joining Port Adelaide's inaugural AFL squad in 1997.

Race to be second South Australian AFL club (1991–1996) 
The admission of Adelaide to the AFL had a devastating impact on the leagues attendances with the SANFL recording a 45% drop between 1990 and 1993. Port Adelaide defied this trend of falling SANFL attendances recording an increase of 13% from 1990 to 1993.

In 1994 the AFL announced that South Australia would receive a licence for a second team based in the state. The major bids competing with Port Adelaide this time around were from merger club proposals in Norwood-Sturt, and Glenelg-South. On 15 June the SANFL handed down a report recommending the second license go to a team formed from the amalgamation of two clubs.

On 16 June it was reported in The Age by Stephen Linnell that "the League's preference was for a single, established club to join the league". The final tenders were submitted to the SANFL on 14 September 1994 including Port Adelaide's second application, Norwood–Sturt's merged club bid with the remaining application coming from Woodville–West Torrens.

On 2 October Port Adelaide won the 1994 SANFL Grand Final, its fifth in seven years. On 13 December Port Adelaide won the tender for the second SA license over its various state rivals, however it was prevented from entering the competition before 1996 as stipulated in the Adelaide license agreement. In 1995 after an SANFL game at Football Park the Adelaide began carrying out a training session which was interrupted by a large hoard of Port Adelaide supporters chanting "We're coming to get you". Adelaide coach Robert Shaw was the only Adelaide official to confront the hoard. In 1996 Port Adelaide was left to wait again as a vacancy was required in the league.

It was announced on 27 October 1995 that Port Adelaide would be participating in the 1997 AFL season, one season later than initially planned and seven years after the clubs first failed bid in 1990.

National premierships (1997–2004) 
From 1997 to 2004 South Australian AFL clubs won three Australian Football League premierships.

Adelaide Oval return (2009–2014) 
After previous hosting the highest level of Australian rules football in South Australia from 1877 to 1973, Adelaide Oval once again became permanent the home of top level Australian rules football in South Australia after a major redevelopment of the ground.

Regional variation
Some variations of Australian Rules Football in South Australia compared with other Australian states still exist:

Points system: In South Australia, most leagues award two points for a win, and one for a draw.  Elsewhere in Australia generally four points are awarded for a win and two for a draw.

Percentage: In South Australia, ladder percentage is usually calculated as "For" ÷ "For and Against" × "100".  Elsewhere in Australia it is generally calculated as "For" ÷ "Against" × "100".

Behind posts: Behind posts have generally been coloured red in South Australia, as opposed to white elsewhere.

Goalkicker listings: Match reports in South Australia generally list goals and behinds scored by player, whereas elsewhere in Australia goals only are generally shown.

Field markings: The "50" on the 50-metre line at AAMI Stadium is in a serif font, whereas at Victorian grounds a sans-serif font is used.

Participation
In 2007, there were 14,825 senior players in SA and total participation of 72,971.

Attendance record
 66,987 (1976). SANFL Grand Final. Sturt vs Port Adelaide. (Football Park, Adelaide)

Major Australian Rules events in South Australia
Australian Football League Premiership Season (Crows and Power home games)
The Showdown
Port Adelaide-Norwood SANFL rivalry
SANFL Grand Final
State League Interstate matches

South Australians in the Australian Football Hall of Fame
see Australian Football Hall of Fame

Legend
 Barrie Robran (North Adelaide)
 Malcolm Blight (Woodville, North Melbourne)
 Jack Oatey
 Russell Ebert

Players

 Mark Bickley (South Adelaide, Adelaide)
 Craig Bradley (Port Adelaide, Carlton)
 Peter Carey (Glenelg)
 John Daly (Norwood, West Adelaide)

 Ken Farmer (North Adelaide)
 Bob Hank (West Torrens)
 Lindsay Head (West Torrens)
 Neil Kerley (W. Adel, S. Adel, Glenelg)
 Stephen Kernahan (Glenelg, Carlton)
 Tom MacKenzie (West Torr., N. Adel)

 Dan Moriarty (South Adelaide)
 Geof Motley (Port Adelaide)
 John Platten (Central District, Hawthorn)
 Bob Quinn (Port Adelaide)
 Jack 'Dinny' Reedman (S.Adl, N.Adl, W.Adl)
 Mark Ricciuto (Adelaide)

Umpires
 Ken Aplin

Coaches
 John Cahill
 Jack Oatey
 Fos Williams

Administrators
 Max Basheer
 Thomas Hill
 Bob McLean

Governing body
The governing body is the South Australian National Football League.

Leagues & Clubs

Professional clubs
Adelaide Football Club (Australian Football League)
Port Adelaide Football Club (Australian Football League)

Open

Adelaide Metropolitan Leagues
South Australian National Football League (governing body)
South Australian Amateur Football League

Regional leagues
Adelaide Plains Football League
Barossa Light & Gawler Football Association
Broken Hill Football League
Eastern Eyre Football League
Far West Football League
Great Flinders Football League
Great Southern Football League
Hills Football League
Kangaroo Island Football League
Kowree-Naracoorte-Tatiara Football League
Mallee Football League
Mid Murray Football Association
Mid South Eastern Football League
North Eastern Football League
Northern Areas Football Association
Port Lincoln Football League
Riverland Football League
River Murray Football League
Southern Football League
Spencer Gulf Football League
Western Border Football League
Whyalla Football League
Woomera & Districts Football League
Yorke Peninsula Football League

The South Australian Country Football Championships is contested annually, and comprises the following representative sides:
 Central (comprises the Barossa Light and Gawler, Adelaide Plains, Northern Areas, North Eastern and Yorke Peninsula Football Leagues)
 Southern Districts (River Murray, Great Southern, Hills, Southern and Kangaroo Island Football Leagues)
 South East (Kowree Naracoorte Tatiara, Mid South Eastern and Western Border Football Leagues)
 Eyre Peninsula (Port Lincoln, Great Flinders, Eastern Eyre and Far West Football Leagues)
 Northern Cities (Whyalla, Woomera & Districts and Spencer Gulf Football Leagues)
 Murray Mallee Barrier Zone (Riverland, Mid Murray, Broken Hill and Mallee Football Leagues)

Women's
 South Australian Women's Football League Official Site

Representative team

The South Australian representative team, also known as the Croweaters, have played State of Origin matches against all other Australian states.

Principal venues
The following venues meet AFL Standard criteria and have been used to host AFL (National Standard) or AFLW level matches (Regional Standard) or SANFL matches and are listed by capacity.

Historic Venues
 Football Park (1974 - 2015)

Sources

See also
South Australian National Football League
Australian Football League
Adelaide Crows
Port Adelaide Magpies
Port Adelaide Football Club
South Australian Football Hall of Fame

External links
South Australia Team of the Century (from Full Points Footy)

 
South
History of Australian rules football